Mirza Mohammad rafi 'Sauda', 
(1713–1781) was an Urdu poet in Delhi, India. He is known for his Ghazals and Urdu Qasidas.

Biography
He was born in 1713  in Shahjahanabad (i.e. Old Delhi), where he was also brought up. At the age of 60 or 66, he moved to Farrukhabad (with Nawab Bangash), and lived there from 1757 to about 1770. In A.H. 1185 (1771–72) he moved to the court of Nawab of Awadh (then in Faizabad) and remained there until his death. When Lucknow became the state capital, he came there with Nawab Shujauddaula.

He died in A.H. 1195 (1780–81) in Lucknow.

Ustads and shagirds
Sulaimān Qulī Ḳhān 'Vidād' and Shaikh Zahuruddin Hatim were his Ustads (teachers of Urdu poetry). King Shah Alam was Shagird (student of Urdu poetry) of Sauda.  He was also Ustad of Shujauddaulla. Nawab Āṣif ud-Daulah gave him title of Malkushshu'ara'' and annual pension of Rs 6,000.

Works
Initially he composed in Persian, but switched to Urdu on the advice of his ustad, Ḳhān-e Ārzū. His work was translated in 1872 by Major Henry Court, Captain, Bengal Cavalry. Kulliyat of Sauda was compiled by Ḥakīm Sayyid Aṣlaḥ. ud-Dīn Ḳhān wrote the introduction. Sauda's works from his Kulliyat are:
 Masnavi dar hajv-e hakim ghaus مثنوی در ھجوِ حکیم غوث
 Masnavi dar hajv-e amir-a daulatmand bakhil  مثنوی در ھجوِ امیرِ دولت مند بخیل
 Masnavi dar ta'rif-e shikar  مثنوی در تعریفِ شکار
 Masnavi dar hajv-e pil rajah nripat singh  مثنوی در ھجو پِل راجن نری پت سنگھ
 Masnavi dar hajv-e sidi faulad khan kotval-e shahjahanabad  مثنوی در ھجو سیدّی فولاد خان کوتوالِ شاجہان آباد 
 Masnavi dar hajv-e fidvi mutavatan-e panjab kih darasal baqal bachchah bud  مثنوی در ھجو فدوی مُطاوِتانِ پنجاب کی دراصل بیقل بچاہ بد
 Masnavi dar hajv-e chipak mirza faizu  مثنوی در ھجو چپک مرزا فیضو
 Qissah-e darvesh kih iradah-e ziyarat-e ka'bah kardah bud  قصّہِ درویش کہ ارادہِ زیارتِ کعبہ کرد بد
 Mukhammas-e shahr ashob مخاماصِ شہر آشوب
 Qasidah dar madh-e navab vazir imad ul-mulk قصیدہ درمدہِ نواب وزیر عماد الملک

References

External links
 Professor Nasim Ahmad's Books (a). Diwane-e-Ghazaliyat-e-Sauda and (b). Mutallaqate Sauda
 Vinay Prajapati 'Nazar' Wordpress blog तख़लीक़-ए-नज़र  – Expanding day by day
 Muhammad Rafi Urdu Poetry

1713 births
1781 deaths
Poets from Delhi
Indian Shia Muslims
Urdu-language poets from India
Indian male poets
18th-century Indian poets
18th-century male writers